Reality tunnel is a theory that, with a subconscious set of mental filters formed from beliefs and experiences, every individual interprets the same world differently, hence "Truth is in the eye of the beholder".  It is similar to the idea of representative realism, and was coined by Timothy Leary (1920–1996). It was further expanded on by Robert Anton Wilson (1932-2007), who wrote about the idea extensively in his 1983 book Prometheus Rising.

Wilson and Leary co-wrote a chapter in Leary's 1988 book Neuropolitique (a revised edition of the 1977 book Neuropolitics), in which they explained further: 
The gene-pool politics which monitor power struggles among terrestrial humanity are transcended in this info-world, i.e. seen as static, artificial charades. One is neither coercively manipulated into another's territorial reality nor forced to struggle against it with reciprocal game-playing (the usual soap opera dramatics). One simply elects, consciously, whether or not to share the other's reality tunnel.

Considerations
Every kind of ignorance in the world all results from not realizing that our perceptions are gambles. We believe what we see and then we believe our interpretation of it, we don't even know we are making an interpretation most of the time. We think this is reality. – Robert Anton Wilson 

The idea does not necessarily imply that there is no objective truth; rather that our access to it is mediated through our senses, experience, conditioning, prior beliefs, and other non-objective factors. The implied individual world each person occupies is said to be their reality tunnel. The term can also apply to groups of people united by beliefs: we can speak of the fundamentalist Christian reality tunnel or the ontological naturalist reality tunnel.

A parallel can be seen in the psychological concept of confirmation bias—the human tendency to notice and assign significance to observations that confirm existing beliefs, while filtering out or rationalizing away observations that do not fit with prior beliefs and expectations. This helps to explain why reality tunnels are usually transparent to their inhabitants. While it seems most people take their beliefs to correspond to the "one true objective reality", Robert Anton Wilson emphasizes that each person's reality tunnel is their own artistic creation, whether they realize it or not.

Wilson — like John C. Lilly in his 1968 book Programming and Metaprogramming in the Human Biocomputer — relates that through various techniques one can break down old reality tunnels and impose new reality tunnels by removing old filters and replacing them with new ones, with new perspectives on reality—at will. This is attempted through various processes of deprogramming using neuro-linguistic programming, cybernetics, hypnosis, biofeedback devices, meditation, controlled use of hallucinogens, and forcibly acting out other reality tunnels. Thus, it is believed one's reality tunnel can be widened to take full advantage of human potential and experience reality on more positive levels. Robert Anton Wilson's Prometheus Rising is (among other things) a guidebook to the exploration of various reality tunnels.

Similar ideas
We don't see things as they are; we see them as we are. – Anaïs Nin

Harvard sociologist Talcott Parsons used the word gloss to describe how the mind perceives reality. We are taught, he theorised, how to "put the world together" by others who subscribe to a consensus reality. "The curious world of Talcott Parsons was where society was a system,  interactive subsystems adhering to a certain set of unwritten rules."

The meme is another source of gloss; it is "transmitted from one mind to another through speech, gestures, rituals, or other imitable phenomena." Because we're social creatures, there are reasons for us to adopt some social currencies.

In line with Kantian thought, as well as the work of Norwood Russell Hanson, studies have indeed shown that our brains "filter" the data coming from our senses. This "filtering" is largely unconscious and may be influenced—more-or-less in many ways, in societies and in individuals—by biology, cultural constructs including education and language (such as memes), life experiences, preferences and mental state, belief systems (e.g. world view, the stock market), momentary needs, pathology, etc.

An everyday example of such filtering is our ability to follow a conversation, or read, without being distracted by surrounding conversations, once called the cocktail party effect.

In his 1986 book Waking Up, Charles Tart—an American psychologist and parapsychologist known for his psychological work on the nature of consciousness—introduced the phrase "consensus trance" to the lexicon. Tart likened normal waking consciousness to hypnotic trance. He discussed how each of us is from birth inducted to the trance of the society around us. Tart noted both similarities and differences between hypnotic trance induction and consensus trance induction. (See G. I. Gurdjieff).

Some disciplines—Zen for example, and monastic schools such as Sufism—seek to overcome such conditioned realities by returning to less thoughtful and channeled states of mind. Similarly, the philosophy of life Pyrrhonism seeks to overcome these conditioned realities by inducing epoche (suspension of judgment) through skeptical arguments.

Constructivism is a modern psychological response to reality-tunneling.
For Wilson, a fully functioning human ought to be aware of their reality tunnel, and be able to keep it flexible enough to accommodate, and to some degree empathize with, different reality tunnels, different "game rules", different cultures.... Constructivist thinking is the exercise of metacognition to become aware of our reality tunnels or labyrinths and the elements that "program" them. Constructivist thinking should, ideally, decrease the chance that we will confuse our map of the world with the actual world.... [This philosophy] is currently expressed in many Eastern consciousness-exploration techniques.

Another example is Lacan's distinction between "The Real" and the "Symbolic". Lacan argued that the Real is the imminent unified reality which is mediated through symbols that allow it to be parsed into intelligible and differentiated segments. The symbolic, which is primarily subconscious, is further abstracted into the Imaginary (our actual beliefs and understandings of reality). These two orders ultimately shape the way we come to perceive reality.

See also
 8-Circuit Model of Consciousness
 Allegory of the Cave
 Altered state of consciousness
 Collective consciousness
 Collective unconscious
 Consensus reality
 Consensus theory of truth
 Cosmic consciousness
 Direct and indirect realism
 Fake news
 General semantics
 Idealism
 Ideasthesia
 Intellectual scotoma
 Paradigm
 Perspectivism
 Phaneron
 Phenomenology
 Philosophy of Perception
 Sensorium
 Schema (psychology)
 Social constructionism
 The Social Construction of Reality
 Self-concept
 Theory of Mind
 Tunnel vision (metaphor)
 Umwelt
 World view

References

Further reading
 Thomas Metzinger, The Ego Tunnel: The Science of the Mind and the Myth of the Self. Basic Books, 2009, 288pp. .
 P. D. Ouspensky, The Fourth Way: A Record of Talks and Answers to Questions Based on the Teaching of G. I. Gurdjieff. (Prepared under the general supervision of Sophia Ouspensky). New York: Knopf, 1957; London: Routledge & Kegan Paul, 1957.

External links
 How our reality tunnels allow us to see only certain things
 Robert Anton Wilson discusses reality tunnel concept (MP3; 11m)

Belief
Consciousness studies
Community building
Popular psychology
Reality
Social constructionism
Timothy Leary
Robert Anton Wilson